The Joan Hodges Queneau Medal is an American engineering award for the field of environmental conservation.

It has been given annually since 1976 for an "outstanding contribution by an engineer in behalf of environmental conservation". The award is administered by the National Audubon Society, and made jointly with the American Association of Engineering Societies.  The award includes a citation, the "Palladium Medal", and a bronze statue.

Award recipients
 1977 - H. Beecher Charmbury
 1983 - Roy W. Hann, Jr.
 1984 - Barbara-Ann Gamboa Lewis
 1985 - William A. Jester
 1986 - Kenneth R. Daniel
 1987 - Thomas K. MacVicar
 1988 - Barney L. Capehart
 1989 - James L. Baker
 1990 - Joseph T. Ling
 1991 - M. Kent Loftin
 1992 - Hsieh Wen Shen
 1994 - Luna Leopold
 1995 - Robert Williams
 1996 - Jared Leigh Cohon
 2002 - William Carrol
 2003 - James W. Poirot
 2004 - Donald Van Norman Roberts
 2005 - George G. Wicks
 2008 - Albert A. Grant
 2010 - Clifford W. Randall
 2011 - Raymond A. Ferrara
 2012 - Rao Y. Surampalli
 2013 - Perry L. McCarty
 2014 - Bruce E. Rittmann
 2015 - Diran Apelian
 2016 - Wendi Goldsmith
 2017 - Jessica E. Kogel
 2018 - D. Yogi Goswami

See also

 List of engineering awards
 List of environmental awards

References
 AAES Queneau Medal past recipients 

Engineering awards
Environmental awards
Awards established in 1976